"If You Ever Fall in Love Again" is a song written by Irish songwriter Dick Farrelly.

Origins and recordings
In 1948, it was the winning song in a BBC-hosted song contest in Northern Ireland and was subsequently recorded by Anne Shelton for whom it became a United Kingdom hit.

It was also recorded by the Guy Lombardo and His Royal Canadians orchestra and the vocal group The Three Suns in the United States.

The song was later recorded on the Farrelly tribute album Legacy of a Quiet Man (2001) by Irish singer Sinead Stone and musician Gerard Farrelly (Dick's son).

Publisher
The song is published by Andic Songs/MCPS.

Farrelly's other works
Farrelly's most-successful song is the "Isle of Innisfree", a worldwide hit for Bing Crosby in 1952 and main theme of the comedy-drama romance film, The Quiet Man (1952). His other compositions include, "We Dreamed our Dreams", "Cottage by the Lee", "Annaghdown", "The Gypsy Maiden", "Man of the Road" and "The Rose of Slievenamon".

References 

1. Des MacHale (2004).  Picture The Quiet Man.  Belfast:  Appletree Press.  .  
 Songwriters Guild of Great Britain publication (the Guild would later become the Performing Rights Society)
 Irish Music Rights Organisation
 myspace.com/gerardfarrelly, website of Gerard Farrelly

External links 
 Irish Music Rights Organisation – article
 Dick Farrelly and Legacy of a Quiet Man album
 Dick Farrelly, songwriter – article by his son
 Appleptree Press, publishers of Picture The Quiet Man
 legacy Tara Music – Legacy of a Quiet Man

1940s songs
Irish songs
Songs written by Dick Farrelly
1948 songs